The following article is a summary of the 2015–16 football season in France, which was the 82nd season of competitive football in the country and ran from July 2015 to June 2016.

League table

Ligue 1

Ligue 2

Championnat National

Championnat de France Amateur

References

 
Seasons in French football